Lillydale Lake (the name retaining the earliest spelling and the name of the former Lillydale Shire) is an artificial lake and wetlands area created in Lilydale, Melbourne, Australia. The park in which it is situated covers over 100 hectares and includes extensive recreational facilities.

The lake covers 28 hectares with a 440 metre long dam wall. The ruins of the 1850s era Cashin's flour mill stand at the northern end of the dam wall. There are over 10 kilometres of shared trails, a community room and meeting facilities, a monster playground, toilets, barbecues and a picnic area. A boat launching ramp provides for non-powered boating. There are also two areas where dogs can exercise off leash.

History

Areas of Lilydale township are low-lying and susceptible to flooding from the Olinda Creek.

In 1853 surveyor James Blackburn saw the site as a location for a water catchment though the Yan Yean Reservoir was eventually built instead.

The local council proposed a 65-hectare park in 1969 with several more proposals made but due to lack of funds none eventuated. Following floods in September 1984, construction of the lake was proposed to prevent future flooding and provide recreational facilities. Construction began in 1988 and was completed in June 1990. It was officially opened to the public on 7 July 1990.

Local residents often walk, run or cycle around the lake for fitness reasons.

References

Further reading

Lillydale Lake: History & Development, Shire of Yarra Ranges, Lilydale, Australia
Lillydale Lake: Park Map, Shire of Yarra Ranges, Lilydale, Australia

Lakes of Melbourne
Reservoirs in Victoria (Australia)
Melbourne Water catchment
Rivers of Greater Melbourne (region)
Constructed wetlands
Yarra Ranges